Mamadou Sarr (born 29 August 2005) is a French professional footballer who plays as a defender for Ligue 1 club Lyon.

Early life

He is the son of former Senegalese International Pape Sarr. Mamadou was born in Martigues while his father was playing for Istres. Sarr spent most of his childhood living in Nord-Pas-de-Calais, following his father who spent a large part of his career at Lens.

Club career

Sarr began his football career at Étoile Sportive de Saint-Laurent-Blangy, before joining Lens, where his father plays.

Sarr then moved to Lyon in 2018.

During the 2021-22 season, at only 16 years old, he established himself as a starter with the Rhone under-19 team. He thus plays an important role in Lyon's triumph in the Coupe Gambardella alongside players like Mathieu Patouillet, Hugo Vogel or Mohamed El Arouch. He scored in the quarter-final against Strasbourg then in the semi-final against Troyes

International career

Eligible to play with Senegal, Mamadou Sarr nevertheless chose France for his first selections for the youth team, even recovering the captain's armband on several occasions with the under-17s. In April 2022, he was selected with the France team for the 2022 UEFA European Under-17 Championship organized in Israel. He was a starter during the competition, where France was crowned as champions after a defeating Netherlands 2-1 in the final thanks to Saël Kumbedi's brace.

Style of play

Trained as a central-back, Sarr also occasionally played as a defensive midfielder during at Lyon's youth teams.

Honours
Lyon Youth
Coupe Gambardella: 2022

U17 France
UEFA European Under-17 Championship: 2022

References

External links

2005 births
Living people
People from Martigues
French footballers
France youth international footballers
French sportspeople of Senegalese descent